Ryan McDaniel (born September 8, 1988) is an American football wide receiver for the Atlanta Havoc of the American Arena League (AAL). He played collegiately at Samford University.

Professional career

Knoxville NightHawks
McDaniel began his professional career with the Knoxville NightHawks of the Professional Indoor Football League (PIFL).

Philadelphia Soul
In February 2013, McDaniel was assigned to the Philadelphia Soul of the Arena Football League (AFL). McDaniel missed most of the 2014 season with an injury, but rebounded nicely in 2015. On August 26, 2016, the Soul beat the Arizona Rattlers in ArenaBowl XXIX by a score of 56–42. On August 26, 2017, the Soul beat the Tampa Bay Storm in ArenaBowl XXX by a score of 44–40.

References

External links
 Arena Football bio

1988 births
Living people
People from Buford, Georgia
Sportspeople from the Atlanta metropolitan area
Players of American football from Georgia (U.S. state)
American football wide receivers
Samford Bulldogs football players
Knoxville NightHawks players
Philadelphia Soul players
American Arena League players